Diplosentis is a genus of worms belonging to the family Diplosentidae.

Species:

Diplosentis amphacanthi 
Diplosentis manteri

References

Acanthocephalans